Orlando Ribeiro de Oliveira (born 9 January 1967), known as Orlando Ribeiro or just Orlando, is a Brazilian football coach and former player who played as a central defender. He is the current head coach of Santos' under-20 squad.

Playing career
Born in São Paulo, Orlando began his career with Juventus-SP's youth setup at the age of 11. After appearing with the first team, he played for Ituano before joining Série A side Atlético Mineiro in 1993.

Orlando returned to Ituano in 1994, and went on to play for clubs in his native state, such as São Carlos, Francana, União Barbarense, Santo André, Etti Jundiaí and São José-SP before retiring at the age of 37. With Barbarense, he won the 1998 Campeonato Paulista Série A2.

Coaching career
Ribeiro joined São Paulo in 2010 as a technical evaluator, being named coach of the under-15s in the following year. He took over the under-17s in 2014, before replacing André Jardine at the helm of the under-20 squad on 21 March 2018.

Ribeiro was sacked by the Tricolor on 16 February 2021, and was named in charge of the under-17 team of Palmeiras on 22 July. He left the post the following 28 February, to take over the under-20 squad of Santos.

On 12 September 2022, Ribeiro was named interim coach of Santos' first team, replacing departing Lisca. Late in the month, he was kept as head coach until the end of the season.

Career statistics

Coaching statistics

Honours

Player
Juventus-SP
Copa São Paulo de Futebol Júnior: 1985

União Barbarense
Campeonato Paulista Série A2: 1998

Manager
São Paulo
Copa São Paulo de Futebol Júnior: 2019

References

1967 births
Living people
Footballers from São Paulo
Brazilian footballers
Association football defenders
Clube Atlético Juventus players
Ituano FC players
Clube Atlético Mineiro players
Grêmio Esportivo Sãocarlense players
Associação Atlética Francana players
União Agrícola Barbarense Futebol Clube players
Esporte Clube Santo André players
Paulista Futebol Clube players
São José Esporte Clube players
Associação Portuguesa de Desportos players
Brazilian football managers
Santos FC non-playing staff
Santos FC managers
Campeonato Brasileiro Série A managers